Merrylands is a suburb in Western Sydney, Australia. Merrylands is located 25 kilometres west of the Sydney central business district and is in the local government area of the Cumberland City Council.

History
Merrylands was named after the former English home of Arthur Todd Holroyd (1806–1887), who acquired land in this area in 1855 and who gave his name to the adjoining suburb of Holroyd.

Commercial area
Merrylands has a commercial area around Merrylands railway station in Merrylands Road, which mainly feature art deco style of buildings constructed in the 1930s and 1940s and is ornamented by a couple of London planetrees. Stockland Merrylands is a shopping centre with supermarkets, discount department stores and specialty shops.

Transport
The Merrylands railway station is serviced by the Inner West & Leppington and Cumberland lines of the Sydney Trains network. There is unlimited parking for commuters. It is on the bus route from Liverpool to Parramatta. Main transport corridors of Woodville Rd (Parramatta-Hume Hwy, Western Motorway M4 (Mountains to the sea). Other main roads include Coleman St (to Westmead Hospital), Hawkesview Rd (rail overbridge to Woodville Rd), Neil St (rail overbridge to Woodville Rd), Pitt St (to Parramatta), Lois St and Excelsior St (to Granville).

Churches
There are a number of churches in Merrylands, including Merrylands East Presbyterian Church, St Margaret Mary's Catholic Church, Merrylands Anglican Church, Merrylands Baptist Church, Merrylands Uniting Church, Merrylands Presbyterian Church, an Evangelical church and C3 Church Merrylands.

St Raphael's Slovenian Catholic Church

There is also a Heritage Catholic Micro-Cathedral in honour of Saint Raphael the Arch-Angel on the corner of Warwick Road and Merrylands Road, which was not only the first and only Church in Merrylands but also one of the most uniquely designed in Western Sydney being a conventional-modern-neo-Gothic design. The Church of St Raphael was conceived by Fr. Valerijan Jenko, OFM, OAM then soon to be completed and consecrated in 1973, by assistant bishop Dr. Stanislav Lenič from Ljubljana, Slovenija (previously Yugoslavia). The next building project was the church hall. Completed in 1983 the hall became the centre of lively cultural activities.

Parks

Central Gardens

With an entry Merrylands Road and Paton Street along the Cumberland Highway this nature reserve has kangaroos, emus, birdlife and waterfalls around the lake. Pinnaroo (Paton Street) and Yarrabee (Merrylands Road) can be hired for the day from Cumberland Council for a fee. Access is by road or bus from Merrylands Station and is a route of the Liverpool to the Parramatta Transitway.

Ted Burge Reserve 

Bounded by Centenary Road, Hollywood, Richmond and Fairmount Streets.  Is used as a sporting field for cricket, soccer, softball and netball.

Merrylands Park

On the corner of Merrylands Road and Burnett Street this complex has sporting fields, tennis courts, barbecue areas and a swim centre which has several outdoor pools and a grassed areas with a barbecue.

Merrylands Swimming Centre 
Merrylands Swimming Centre was opened in 1968 and is owned and operated by Cumberland Council. The Swimming Centre was heated in 2004 and consists of 3 pools. An 8 lane 50m competition pool, a training pool and a babies pool. The water in the competition and training pools is heated to 27 °C.
The centre is the home of the Merrylands Amateur Swimming Club – the second largest swimming club in the City of Cumberland and one of the largest in the South West of the Sydney Metropolitan Area.

Granville Park 
Bounded by Merrylands Road (east of the railway line), Claremont Street, Montrose Avenue and Woodville Road the park is approximately 13.2ha in area. McDonald's has a restaurant on the corner of the park with access from Merrylands Road and Woodville Road.  It has several sporting fields, a barbecue area, basketball court, cricket and nets, and playground equipment. When the circuses arrive they stay here.

During WWII Granville Park was used as US Naval Base Hospital No 10, part of Naval Base Sydney.

Cycleways 

Several main cycle routes pass through Merrylands and surrounding suburbs and linking up to Liverpool, Penrith and Sydney Harbour.  M4 has an exit in Crown Street, Parramatta for Parrmatta, Merrylands and Holroyd access.

Climate
Merrylands has a temperate climate, with hot summers and mild winters. The average summer maximum temperature is 27.9 °C, but hot north-westerly winds can cause temperatures to rise to +40 °C. The highest temperature recorded in the Merrylands area was 45.5 °C on 18 January 2013. The average winter maximum temperature is 18.1 °C, however, +27 °C days have occurred, mostly in August. The coldest temperature recorded was −1.0 °C on 12 July 2002. The average yearly rainfall is 830.5mm.

Population

Demographics
At the 2016 census, Merrylands had a recorded population of 29,653. Of these people:
 44.0% were born in Australia; the next most common countries of birth were Lebanon 7.9%, China (excludes SARs and Taiwan) 5.0%, Afghanistan 4.3%, India 3.9% and Pakistan 2.4%.
 29.4% of people only spoke English at home; other languages spoken at home included Arabic 22.5%, Mandarin 5.2%, Dari 3.3%, Cantonese 2.7% and Turkish 2.7%.
 The most common religions were Catholic 29.2%, Islam 24.6%, No Religion 11.7%, Not stated 8.4% and Hinduism 4.6%.
 The median age was 32 years. Children aged 0 – 14 years made up 21.3% of the population and people aged 65 years and over made up 10.6% of the population.

Notable residents
Some of the current and former residents of Merrylands include:
 Betty Cuthbert – track and field athlete. Born in Merrylands.
 Eric Tweedale – rugby union player. Raised in Merrylands
 Liam Fulton – rugby league player. Born and resides in Merrylands.
 Rick Springfield – Singer, musician and actor.  Born in Merrylands.
 Matthew Gardiner – Trade Unionist. Raised in Merrylands
 Paul Nakad – Musician and actor. Resides in Merrylands.
 John Ibrahim - nightclub owner. He and his brothers grew up in Merrylands and his mother still resides there.

References

The Book of Sydney Suburbs, Compiled by Frances Pollen, Angus & Robertson Publishers, 1990, Published in Australia 

Suburbs of Sydney
Populated places established in 1855
Cumberland Council, New South Wales
1855 establishments in Australia